Mauro De Vecchis (born 20 October 1967) is an Italian football coach who has spent the majority of his career in Italy, with stints in Albania and Papua New Guinea.

References

1967 births
Living people
Italian football managers
Kategoria Superiore managers
FC Kamza managers
KF Bylis Ballsh managers
Italian expatriate football managers
Expatriate football managers in Albania
Italian expatriate sportspeople in Albania